Vertical Aerospace is an aerospace manufacturer based in Bristol, England. It designs and builds zero emission, electric vertical take-off and landing (eVTOL) electrically powered aircraft.

History

2016 
The company was founded in 2016 by Stephen Fitzpatrick, an ex-Formula One team owner, and founder and CEO of OVO Energy.

2018 
The aircraft, which was unmanned and remotely controlled, is capable of vertical take-off and landing (VTOL) and has four electric engines, each inside a ducted fan.

2019 
In 2019, the company became Honeywell's first eVTOL customer, buying their fly-by-wire aircraft control systems for a future Vertical Aerospace aircraft, the VA-X4.  Further in 2019 they launched their second aircraft, VA-X2, making them the first company in the world to release flight footage of an electric VTOL aircraft capable of carrying . 2019 was also the year the company appointed its President, Michael Cervenka, former Head of Future Business Propositions at Rolls-Royce.

2020 
In 2020, the company announced the VX4, a significant departure from the company’s previous multicopter design. They also established Vertical Advanced Engineering, in order to apply technologies and agile processes from F1 to the development of eVTOL aircraft.

2021 
In January 2021, they joined a consortium of urban air mobility and aviation companies to work with the Civil Aviation Authority as part of its Future Air Mobility Regulatory Sandbox. The company announced that they would be partnering companies like Skyports Limited, Atkins, a member of the SNC-Lavalin Group, and the West of England Combined Authority.

Also in February 2021, the company announced it was partnering with Solvay S.A. for the development of the composite structure of its vehicle. In March, the company announced it was partnering with Rolls-Royce for the development of its electrical power system.

In May 2021, former Airbus CEO Urban Mobility, Eduardo Dominguez Puerta joined Vertical Aerospace as Chief Commercial Officer. In June 2021, it was announced that the company would merge with Broadstone Acquisition Corp, a special purpose acquisition company (SPAC), founded by Hugh Osmond. Additionally, the company announced that it would float on the NYSE.

In June 2021, the company was exploring a flying taxi service as part of a partnership with Virgin Atlantic. and American Airlines announced a pre-order of up to 250 aircraft with an option for an additional 100.

The company originally stated a goal of commercial flight by 2022. In its most recent announcements, it appears to be targeting 2024.

In December 2021, the company listed on the New York Stock Exchange (NYSE) following the merger with Broadstone Acquisition Corp under the ticker EVTL.

2022 
In January 2022, the company appointed Avolon's Dómhnal Slattery as Vertical Chairman.

VX4 
The VX4 is claimed to be a piloted, zero emissions electric Vertical Take Off and Landing (eVTOL) vehicle. The proposed aircraft is intended to operate in and out of cities and other confined locations, The VX4 is claimed to be 100 times quieter and safer than a helicopter.

It would rely on its fixed wing for lift during most of flight. This shift follows a broader move across the eVTOL industry towards wing-borne lift + cruise and vectored thrust concepts, due to the efficiency gains wing-borne lift offers during the cruise portion of flight.

The aircraft accomplished its first takeoff and landing while tethered to the ground in September 2022.  The aircraft has orders from American Airlines, Virgin Atlantic and AirAsia, among others.

Partners and Investors 
In June 2021, the company teamed up with American Airlines, Avolon, Rolls-Royce, Honeywell and Microsoft's M12 as partners and investors. The partners and investors enable an expected path to certification in 2024, de-risk execution, allow for a lean cost structure, and production at scale. Other partners include GKN Aerospace and Solvay.

The company's partnership with American Airlines, Avolon, and Virgin Atlantic will see forward sales under pre-orders for up to 1,000 aircraft.

References

External links

Companies based in Bristol
2016 establishments in England
British companies established in 2016
Aerospace companies of the United Kingdom